Weezer is an American rock band formed in Los Angeles, California, in 1992. Since 2001, the band has consisted of Rivers Cuomo (vocals, guitar, keyboards), Patrick Wilson (drums, backing vocals), Scott Shriner (bass guitar, keyboards, backing vocals), and Brian Bell (guitar, keyboards, backing vocals).

After signing to Geffen Records in 1993, Weezer released their self-titled debut album, also known as the Blue Album, in May 1994. Backed by music videos for the singles "Buddy Holly", "Undone – The Sweater Song", and "Say It Ain't So", the Blue Album became a multiplatinum success. Weezer's second album, Pinkerton (1996), featuring a darker, more abrasive sound, was a commercial failure and initially received mixed reviews, but achieved cult status and critical acclaim years later. Both the Blue Album and Pinkerton are now frequently cited among the best albums of the 1990s. Following the tour for Pinkerton, founding bassist Matt Sharp left the band and Weezer went on hiatus.

In 2001, Weezer returned with the Green Album with their new bassist, Mikey Welsh. With a more pop sound, and promoted by singles "Hash Pipe" and "Island in the Sun", it was a commercial success and received mostly positive reviews. After the Green Album tour, Welsh left for health reasons and was replaced by Shriner. Weezer's fourth album, Maladroit (2002), incorporated a hard-rock sound and achieved mostly positive reviews, but weaker sales. Make Believe (2005) received mixed reviews, but its single "Beverly Hills" became Weezer's first single to top the US Modern Rock Tracks chart and their first to reach the top ten on the Billboard Hot 100.

In 2008, Weezer released the Red Album; its lead single, "Pork and Beans", became the third Weezer song to top the Modern Rock Tracks chart, backed by a Grammy-winning music video. Raditude (2009) and Hurley (2010) featured more "modern pop production" and songs co-written with other artists, achieved further mixed reviews and moderate sales. Everything Will Be Alright in the End (2014) and the White Album (2016) returned to a rock style that was reminiscent of their 90s sound mixed with modern alternative production and achieved more positive reviews; Pacific Daydream (2017) featured a more mainstream pop sound. In 2019, Weezer released an album of covers, the Teal Album, followed by the Black Album. In 2021, they released OK Human, which featured an orchestral pop sound and was met with critical acclaim, followed by the hard rock–inspired Van Weezer. In 2022, they released a series of extended plays based around the four seasons, a project known as SZNZ.

Weezer have sold 10 million albums in the US and over 35 million worldwide.

History

Formation and first years (1986–1994)
Vocalist and guitarist Rivers Cuomo moved to Los Angeles from Connecticut in 1989 with his high school metal band, Avant Garde, later renamed Zoom. After the group disbanded, Cuomo met drummer Patrick Wilson, and moved in with him and Wilson's friend Matt Sharp. Wilson and Cuomo formed a band, Fuzz, and enlisted Scottie Chapman on bass. Chapman quit after a few early shows; the band reformed as Sixty Wrong Sausages, with Cuomo's friend Pat Finn on bass and Jason Cropper on guitar, but soon disbanded. Cuomo moved to Santa Monica, California, and recorded dozens of demos, including the future Weezer songs "The World Has Turned and Left Me Here" and "Undone – The Sweater Song". Sharp was enthusiastic about the demos, and became the group's bassist and de facto manager.

Cuomo, Wilson, Sharp and Cropper formed Weezer on February 14, 1992. Their first show was on March 19, 1992, closing for Keanu Reeves' band Dogstar. They took their name from a nickname Cuomo's father gave him. Cuomo gave Sharp one year to get the band a record deal before Cuomo accepted a scholarship at the University of California, Berkeley. In November, Weezer recorded a demo, The Kitchen Tape, including a version of the future Weezer single "Say It Ain't So". The demo was heard by Todd Sullivan, an A&R man at Geffen Records, who signed Weezer in June 1993.

The "Blue Album" (1994)

Weezer recorded their debut album with producer Ric Ocasek at Electric Lady Studios in New York City. Cropper was fired during recording, as Cuomo and Sharp felt he was threatening the band chemistry.  He was replaced by Brian Bell. Weezer's self-titled debut album, also known as the "Blue Album", was released in May 1994. Described by Pitchfork as integrating "geeky humor, dense cultural references, and positively gargantuan hooks", it combined alternative rock, power pop, polished production and what AllMusic critic Stephen Thomas Erlewine called an "'70s trash-rock predilection ... resulting in something quite distinctive".

Weezer's first single, "Undone – The Sweater Song", was backed by a music video directed by Spike Jonze; filmed in an unbroken take, it featured Weezer performing on a sound stage with little action, barring a pack of dogs swarming the set. The video became an instant hit on MTV. The song reached No. 57 on the Billboard Hot 100. Jonze also directed Weezer's second video, "Buddy Holly", splicing the band into footage from the 1970s television sitcom Happy Days. The video achieved heavy rotation on MTV and won four MTV Video Music Awards, including Breakthrough Video and Best Alternative Music Video, and two Billboard Music Video Awards. "Buddy Holly" peaked at No. 18 on the Hot 100 Airplay and No. 2 on the Billboard Modern Rock chart. The song is included on Rolling Stone's 500 Best Songs Of All Time. A third single, "Say It Ain't So", followed. It was met with critical acclaim and later Pitchfork ranked it #10 on the top 200 tracks of the 90s list. The song reached No. 51 on the Hot 100 Airplay chart and No. 7 on the Billboard Modern Rock chart.

Their debut album gained critical and commercial success. In 2020, Rolling Stone ranked it number 294 on The 500 Greatest Albums Of All Time. Weezer is certified quadruple platinum in the United States as well as Canada, making it Weezer's best-selling album.

Pinkerton (1995–1997)

In 1994, Weezer took a break from touring for the Christmas holidays. Cuomo traveled to his home state of Connecticut and began recording demos for Weezer's next album. His original concept was a space-themed rock opera, Songs from the Black Hole, that would express his mixed feelings about success." The album featured a story in which each member of the band played a character. Other characters were played by Rachel Haden (The Rentals and That Dog), Joan Wasser (The Dambuilders), and Karl Koch. The story was set in 2126, with the spaceship Betsy II embarking on a galaxy-wide mission. Cuomo conceived the story as a metaphor for his conflicted feelings about touring in a successful rock band. The ship's name Betsy II is taken from Weezer's first tour bus, nicknamed Betsy; M1 represents Weezer's management and record label; Wuan and Dondó represent the part of Cuomo that was excited about success; Jonas represents his doubts and longing; Laurel and Maria represent his relationships with women. Weezer developed the concept through intermittent recording sessions through 1995. At the end of the year, Cuomo enrolled at Harvard University, where his songwriting became "darker, more visceral and exposed, less playful", and he abandoned Songs from the Black Hole.

While attending Harvard, Cuomo experienced loneliness and frustration while also undergoing an extensive surgery for his left leg. These experiences influenced his songwriting for the next record. The other members of Weezer decided to embark on their own side projects during this time. Sharp started The Rentals who released their debut album, Return of the Rentals, in October 1995. The album also featured Patrick Wilson on drums. Wilson also formed his band, The Special Goodness, during this time. Bell decided to work on his band, Space Twins.

Weezer's second album, Pinkerton, was released on September 24, 1996. Pinkerton is named after the character BF Pinkerton from Madama Butterfly, who marries and then abandons a Japanese woman named Butterfly. Calling him an "asshole American sailor similar to a touring rock star", Cuomo felt the character was "the perfect symbol for the part of myself that I am trying to come to terms with on this album". It produced three singles: "El Scorcho", "The Good Life", and "Pink Triangle".

With a darker, more abrasive sound, Pinkerton sold poorly compared to the Blue Album and received mixed reviews; it was voted "one of the worst albums of 1996" in a Rolling Stone reader poll. However, the album eventually gained a cult following and came to be considered among Weezer's best work; in 2002, Rolling Stone readers voted Pinkerton the 16th greatest album of all time, and it has been listed in several critics' "best albums of all time" lists. In 2004, Rolling Stone gave the album a new review, awarding it five out of five stars and adding it to the "Rolling Stone Hall of Fame". Pinkerton was later certified platinum in 2016.

In July 1997, sisters Mykel, Carli and Trysta Allan died in a car accident while driving home from a Weezer show in Denver, Colorado. Mykel and Carli ran Weezer's fan club and helped manage publicity for several other Los Angeles bands, and had inspired the "Sweater Song" B-side "Mykel and Carli". Weezer canceled a show to attend their funeral. In August, Weezer and other bands held a benefit concert for the family in Los Angeles. A compilation album, Hear You Me! A Tribute to Mykel and Carli, was dedicated to their memory. The album included "Mykel and Carli", as well as songs by Ozma, That Dog, and Kara's Flowers. In 2001, Jimmy Eat World released "Hear You Me" which was dedicated to Mykel and Carli.

Hiatus (1997–2000)

Weezer completed the Pinkerton tour in mid-1997 and went on hiatus. Wilson returned to his home in Portland, Oregon to work on his side project, the Special Goodness, and Bell worked on his band Space Twins. In 1998, Sharp left Weezer due to differences with the band members. He said of his departure: "I certainly have my view of it, as I'm sure everybody else has their sort of foggy things. When you have a group that doesn't communicate, you're going to have a whole lot of different stories."

Cuomo returned to Harvard but took a break to focus on songwriting. He formed a new band composed of a changing lineup of Boston musicians, and performed new material. The songs were abandoned, but bootlegs of the Boston shows are traded on the internet. Wilson eventually flew to Boston to join Homie, another Cuomo side project. The members of the band were composed of Greg Brown (Cake and Deathray), Matt Sharp, Yuval Gabay (Soul Coughin) and Sulfur), Adam Orth (Shufflepuck), and future Weezer bassist Mikey Welsh. Although a Homie album was being recorded, they ended up only releasing one song called "American Girls" for the 1998 film Meet The Deedles.

In February 1998, Cuomo, Bell and Wilson reunited in Los Angeles to start work on the next Weezer album. Rumors suggest Sharp did not rejoin the band and left the group in April 1998, which Sharp denies. The group hired Mikey Welsh, who had played with Cuomo in Boston, as their new bassist. Welsh was also previously a bassist for Juliana Hatfield. Weezer continued rehearsing and recording demos until late 1998. Frustration and creative disagreements led to a decline in rehearsals, and in late 1998, Wilson left for his home in Portland pending renewed productivity from Cuomo. In November 1998, the band played two club shows with a substitute drummer in California under the name Goat Punishment, consisting entirely of covers of Nirvana and Oasis songs. In the months following, Cuomo entered a period of depression, unplugging his phone, painting the walls of his home black, and putting fiberglass insulation over his windows to prevent light from entering. Eventually during this time, Cuomo started experimenting with his music and ended up writing 121 songs by 1999. In the meantime, Wilson continued to work with The Special Goodness while Bell again worked with Space Twins. Welsh continued to tour with Juliana Hatfield.

Comeback and the "Green Album" (2000–2001)

Weezer reunited in April 2000, when they accepted a lucrative offer to perform at the Fuji Rock Festival. The festival served as a catalyst for Weezer's productivity, and from April to May 2000, they rehearsed and demoed new songs in Los Angeles. They returned to live shows in June 2000, playing small unpromoted concerts once again under the name Goat Punishment. In June 2000, the band joined the American Warped Tour for nine dates.

In the summer of 2000, Weezer went on tour, including dates on the Vans Warped Tour. Eventually, the band went back into the studio to produce a third album, the "Green Album". Due to the mixed reception of Pinkerton, Cuomo wrote less personal lyrics for the Green Album. The band hired Ric Ocasek who had also produced the band's debut album. Shortly after the release, Weezer went on another American tour. The album was supported by the singles "Hash Pipe", "Island in the Sun", and "Photograph". Executives suggested that "Don't Let Go" should be chosen as the first single. However, Cuomo continued to fight and "Hash Pipe" eventually became the album's first single. "Hash Pipe" peaked at No. 2 on the Billboard Modern Rock chart and No. 6 on the Bubbling Under Hot 100 chart. "Island In the Sun" was released as the second single and became a radio hit as well as one of their biggest overseas hits. The song peaked at No. 11 on the Bubbling Under Hot 100 chart. The label tried to postpone the release date of Weezer further until June, but they ended up sticking to the album's original release date of May 15 release date. The album debuted at number 4 on the Billboard 200 and has since been certified platinum.

After suffering a breakdown from the stress of touring, undiagnosed bipolar disorder, and drug abuse, Welsh attempted suicide and left Weezer in 2001. He later joined The Kickovers for a short stint before retiring from music. He was replaced by Scott Shriner. During this time, Spike Jonze returned to film a music video for "Island In the Sun". Matt Sharp was originally intended to appear in the video, but it did not end up happening.

Maladroit (2002)

Weezer took an experimental approach for the recording process of its fourth album by allowing fans to download in-progress mixes of new songs from its official website in return for feedback. After the release of the album, the band said that this process was something of a failure, as the fans did not supply the group with coherent, constructive advice. Cuomo eventually delegated song selection for the album to the band's original A&R rep, Todd Sullivan, saying that Weezer fans chose the "wackest songs". Only the song "Slob" was included on the album due to general fan advice.

The recording was also done without input from Weezer's record label, Interscope. Cuomo had what he then described as a "massive falling out" with the label. In early 2002, well before the official release of the album, the label sent out a letter to radio stations requesting the song be pulled until an official, sanctioned single was released. Interscope also briefly shut down Weezer's audio/video download webpage, removing all the MP3 demos.

In April 2002, former bassist Matt Sharp sued the band, alleging, among several accusations, that he was owed money for cowriting several Weezer songs. The suit was later settled out of court.

The fourth album, Maladroit, was released on May 14, 2002, only one year after its predecessor. The album served as a harder-edged version of the band's trademark catchy pop-influenced music, and was replete with busy 1980s-style guitar solos. Although met with generally positive critical reviews, its sales were not as strong as those for the Green Album. Two singles were released from the album. The music video for "Dope Nose" featured an obscure Japanese motorcycle gang, and was put into regular rotation. The song reached No. 8 on the Billboard Modern Rock chart. The music video for "Keep Fishin'" combined Weezer with the Muppets, and had heavy rotation on MTV. Both videos were directed by Marcos Siega.

Spin reviewed it as the 6th best album of 2002. A Rolling Stone reader's poll also from that year voted it the 90th greatest album of all time.

Weezer released its much-delayed first DVD on March 23, 2004. The Video Capture Device DVD chronicles the band from its beginnings through Maladroits Enlightenment Tour. Compiled by Karl Koch, the DVD features home video footage, music videos, commercials, rehearsals, concert performances, television performances, and band commentary. The DVD was certified "gold" on November 8, 2004.

Make Believe (2003–2006)
Before working on new material, Cuomo discovered vipassana meditation which became a large influence to his songwriting. He decided to take a more personal approach to his writing once again. One song during this process, "The Other Way", was written for Cuomo's ex-girlfriend Jennifer Chiba after her then-boyfriend, singer-songwriter Elliott Smith, died by suicide. Cuomo said, "I wanted to console her, but I was confused and skeptical about my own motives for wanting to do so, so I wrote that song about that."

Before recording material for their 4th album, Brian Bell and Patrick Wilson worked on their own projects. Bell's Space Twins released The End of Imagining which Rolling Stone critic, John D. Lueressen  named the 7th best album of 2003. Meanwhile, Wilson's The Special Goodness released Land Air Sea. 
From December 2003 to the fall of 2004, Weezer recorded a large amount of material intended for a new album to be released in the spring of 2005 with producer Rick Rubin. The band's early recording efforts became available to the public through the band's website. The demos were a big hit, but none of the songs recorded at this time were included on the finished album. That album, titled Make Believe, was released on May 10, 2005. The album debuted at No. 2 on the Billboard 200. Despite commercial success, Make Believe got a mixed reception from critics, receiving an average score of 52 on review collator Metacritic. Although some reviews, such as AMG's, compared it favorably to Pinkerton, others, among them Pitchfork, panned the album as predictable and lyrically poor.

The album's first single, "Beverly Hills", became a hit in the U.S. and worldwide, staying on the charts for several months after its release. It became the first Weezer song to hit No. 1 on the Billboard Modern Rock chart and No. 10 on the Billboard Hot 100. "Beverly Hills" was nominated for Best Rock Song at the 48th Annual Grammy Awards, the first ever Grammy nomination for the band. The video was also nominated for Best Rock Video at the 2005 MTV Video Music Awards. The second single released from Make Believe was "We Are All on Drugs". MTV refused to play the song, so Weezer re-recorded the lyrics by replacing "on drugs" with "in love" and renaming the song "We Are All in Love". In early 2006, it was announced that Make Believe was certified platinum, and "Beverly Hills" was the second most popular song download on iTunes for 2005, finishing just behind "Hollaback Girl" by Gwen Stefani. Make Believes third single, "Perfect Situation", reached No. 1 U.S. Billboard Modern Rock chart and No. 51 on the Billboard Hot 100. "This Is Such a Pity" was the band's fourth single from the album, but no music video was made for its release. The Make Believe tour also found the band using additional instruments onstage, adding piano, synthesizers, pseudophones, and guitarist Bobby Schneck.

The "Red Album" (2006–2008)
After the success of Make Believe, the band decided to take a break. Cuomo returned to Harvard where he ended up graduating cum laude and as a Phi Beta Kappa in 2006. Cuomo also married Kyoko Ito on June 18, 2006, a woman he had known since March 1997. The wedding was attended by the current members of the band as well as Matt Sharp and Jason Cropper. During this break, Patrick Wilson and Brian Bell appeared in the 2006 film Factory Girl playing John Cale and Lou Reed respectively and contributing a cover of the Velvet Underground song "Heroin" for the film. Also during this time, Bell started a new project, The Relationship. 
Weezer (also known as the Red Album) was released in June 2008. Rick Rubin produced the album and Rich Costey mixed it. The record was described as "experimental", and according to Cuomo, who claimed it at the time to be Weezer's "boldest and bravest and showiest album," included longer and non-traditional songs, TR-808 drum machines, synthesizers, Southern rap, baroque counterpoint, and band members other than Cuomo writing, singing, and switching instruments. Pat Wilson said the album cost about a million dollars to make, contrasting it with the $150,000 budget of the Blue Album. The album was produced by Rick Rubin and Jacknife Lee. The album debuted at No. 4 on the Billboard 200 while receiving generally positive reviews.

Its lead single, "Pork and Beans", topped the Billboard Modern Rock Tracks charts for 11 weeks while also peaking at No. 64 on the Billboard Hot 100. Its music video won a Grammy for Best Short Form Music Video. The second single, "Troublemaker", debuted at No. 39 on the Billboard Hot Modern Rock Tracks chart and peaked at No. 2. In October 2008, the group announced that the third single would be "The Greatest Man That Ever Lived (Variations on a Shaker Hymn)" which was met with critical praise.

On May 30, 2008, the Toledo Free Press revealed in an interview with Shriner that Weezer would be unveiling the "Hootenanny Tour", in which fans would be invited to bring their own instruments to play along with the band. Said Shriner: "They can bring whatever they want... oboes, keyboards, drums, violins, and play the songs with us as opposed to us performing for them."

The band performed five dates in Japan at the beginning of September and then embarked on what was dubbed the "Troublemaker" tour, consisting of 21 dates around North America, including two in Canada. Angels and Airwaves and Tokyo Police Club joined the band as support at each show, and Brian Bell's other band The Relationship also performed at a handful of dates. Shortly before the encore at each show, the band would bring on fans with various instruments and perform "Island in the Sun" and "Beverly Hills" with the band. At a show in Austin, after Tokyo Police Club had played its set, Cuomo was wheeled out in a box and mimed to a recording of rare Weezer demo, "My Brain", dressed in pajamas and with puppets on his hands, before being wheeled off again. This bizarre event later surfaced as the climax to a promo video for Cuomo's second demo album, Alone 2.

Raditude and Hurley (2009–2013)

Weezer toured with Blink-182 in 2009, including an August 30 stop at the Virgin Festival at Merriweather Post Pavilion in Columbia, Maryland. Drummer Josh Freese joined Weezer on a temporary basis to play drums on the tour, while Pat Wilson switched to guitar. Wilson said in an interview for Yahoo! Music that Cuomo wanted "to be active and more free on stage and him having guitar on was an impediment." Freese stated he was a Weezer fan and did not want to pass up the opportunity to play with the band.

On August 18, 2009 Weezer released the first single for their upcoming album, "If You're Wondering If I Want You To". The song peaked at No. 81 on the Billboard Hot 100. The title of the album was called Raditude which was a suggestion from actor Rainn Wilson.

Raditude'''s album artwork was revealed on September 11, featuring a National Geographic contest-winning photograph of a jumping dog named Sidney. The record's release was pushed to November 3, 2009, where it debuted as the seventh best-selling album of the week on the Billboard 200 chart. The band scheduled tour dates in December 2009 extending into early 2010 to coincide with the new album's release. On December 6, 2009, Cuomo was injured when his tour bus crashed in Glen, New York due to black ice. Cuomo suffered three broken ribs and internal bleeding, and his assistant broke two ribs. His wife, baby daughter, and their nanny were also on the bus, but they escaped injury. Weezer cancelled the remaining 2009 tour dates the following day. The band resumed touring on January 20, 2010.

In December 2009, it was revealed that the band was no longer with Geffen Records. The band stated that new material would still be released, but the band members were unsure of the means, whether it be self-released, released online, or getting signed by another label. Eventually, the band was signed to the independent label Epitaph.

Weezer co-headlined The Bamboozle in May 2010, and performed at the Bonnaroo Music and Arts Festival in Manchester, Tennessee in June. In August, 2010, Weezer performed at the Reading and Leeds Festival, and performed at the Voodoo Experience festival in New Orleans, LA in October 2010.

The album Hurley was released in September 2010 through Epitaph Records. The name comes from the character Hugo "Hurley" Reyes from the television show Lost. Jorge Garcia, the actor who portrayed Hurley, stated that being featured on the album cover is "one of the biggest honors of [his] career."  The first single, "Memories" was chosen as part of the Jackass 3D soundtrack with the music video featuring members of the cast contributing backing vocals.

Weezer used internet streaming service YouTube as a way to promote the album. Weezer loaned itself to 15 amateur online video producers, "going along with whatever plans the creator could execute in about 30 minutes." The band was promoted through popular channels such as Barely Political, Ray William Johnson and Fred Figglehorn. The Gregory Brothers solicited musical and vocal contributions from the band on one of its compositions built around speeches by Rep. Charles Rangel and President Barack Obama. Weezer calls the promotion "The YouTube Invasion".

In November 2010, Weezer released a compilation album composed of re-recorded versions of unused recordings spanning from 1993-2010, Death to False Metal. RC:... we just started working on our 10th record. (In reference to an upcoming album, with Hurley being the band's 8th album and Death to False Metal being the band's 9th) The title track, "Turning Up The Radio" was a collaborative effort with many fans on Youtube. On the same day a deluxe version of Pinkerton, which includes "25 demos, outtakes and live tracks" was also released. A third volume of Cuomo's solo Alone series, titled Alone III: The Pinkerton Years, consisting of demos and outtakes from the Pinkerton sessions, was released on December 12, 2011. The band also contributed a cover of the Cars' "You Might Think" for the Disney-Pixar film Cars 2 as well as a cover of The Monkees' "I'm a Believer" for Shrek Forever After.Weezer began working on their ninth studio album in September 2010 with the intent of a 2011 release, but the year ended without seeing a release. On October 8, 2011, former Weezer bassist Mikey Welsh was found dead from a suspected heroin overdose in a Chicago hotel room. Weezer performed in Chicago the next day and dedicated the concert to Welsh, who was expected to have attended. Welsh had previously joined Weezer on stage for a few performances between 2010 and 2011.

The band headlined a four-day rock-themed Carnival Cruise from Miami to Cozumel that set sail on January 19, 2012. In July, Weezer headlined the inaugural Bunbury Music Festival in Cincinnati, Ohio. In early 2013 the band brought its Memories Tour to Australia—the band's first Australian tour since 1996. The band played its first two albums in full at several venues. The band also headlined the Punkspring 2013 tour in Japan and later in the year toured Canada and USA. They played multiple nights in cities around the U.S. The first night shows were dedicated to playing their hits, then the Blue album in full, front to back. The second night, they played Pinkerton in the same fashion. Koch did a "Memories" slide show at the Gibson amphitheater in Los Angeles (And most likely many other venues around the U.S.) The slide show consisted of photos of gigs over the years and highlighted the loss of their fanclub team members Mykel and Carli Allan in 1997.

Everything Will Be Alright in the End and the "White Album" (2013–2016)

Over 200 tracks were considered for their next album, but they were able to narrow it down to 13. According to the album's official press release, the album is organized thematically around three groups of songs: "Belladonna", "The Panopticon Artist" and "Patriarchia". "Belladonna" includes the songs "Ain't Got Nobody", "Lonely Girl", "Da Vinci", "Go Away", "Cleopatra" and "Return to Ithaka", all of which deal with Cuomo's relationships with women. Tracks under "The Panopticon Artist" include "Back to the Shack", "I've Had It Up To Here" and "The Waste Land" all deal with Cuomo's relationships with fans. The final group of songs, "Patriarchia", are "Eulogy for a Rock Band", "The British Are Coming", "Foolish Father" and "Anonymous", which deal with relationships with father figures, "with a new spin".

In January 2014, Weezer began recording with producer Ric Ocasek, who had produced the "Blue Album" and the "Green Album". A clip of a new song was posted on the band's official YouTube account on March 19, 2014, which confirmed previous rumors of the band being in the studio. On June 12, 2014, it was revealed that the album title would be Everything Will Be Alright in the End. It was released on October 7, 2014 to generally favorable reviews, becoming the band's best-reviewed release since Pinkerton. The first single, "Back to the Shack", reached No. 5 on the Alternative Airplay chart.

On October 26, 2015, the band released a new single, "Thank God for Girls", through Apple Music and to radio the same day. The following week, the band released a second single, "Do You Wanna Get High?". Cuomo claimed in an interview with Zane Lowe, that the band was not working on a new album. Later, on January 14, 2016, Weezer released a third single, "King of the World", and announced the "White Album", which continued the critical success of the band's previous release.

While writing the album, Cuomo joined Tinder to meet with people to get inspired for new songs. He also started to explore other songwriting techniques including a cut-up technique, stream-of-consciousness, and writing melodies with a piano instead of guitar.Weezer was officially released on April 1, 2016 and peaked at No. 4 on the Billboard 200. The album is considered a concept album exploring the themes of gender dynamics, modern dating experiences and references to religious iconography. Musically, the album serves as a throwback to the band's first two albums, Weezer (1994) and Pinkerton (1996), while also serving as a tribute to the Beach Boys.

The album received a grammy nomination for Best Rock Album for the 59th Annual Grammy Awards.

In support of the album, the band performed on the Weezer & Panic! at the Disco Summer Tour 2016 with Panic! at the Disco in 2016. The band later signed to Atlantic Records as part of a joint venture between Warner Music Group and Crush Management.

Pacific Daydream (2017–2018)

Soon after the release of the White Album, Cuomo discussed plans for Weezer's next album, provisionally titled the "Black Album'. Cuomo said the album would tackle "more mature topics" and be "less summer day and more winter night", and suggested the band could return to the recording studio as soon as October 2016. Weezer delayed recording after Cuomo felt his new material was more "like reveries from a beach at the end of the world [... as if] the Beach Boys and the Clash fell in love by the ocean and had one hell of an amazing baby".

To write the album, Cuomo utilized various musical and lyrical fragments he had collected over time. He kept an archive of song ideas and hired programmers to organize a spreadsheet of lyric snippets by beats per minute, syllable, and key to call from whenever stuck. "Instead of trying to force myself to feel inspired, I can just go into the spreadsheet and search [...] I just try them out to see which ones work magically."

On March 16, 2017, Weezer released a new song, "Feels Like Summer", the lead single of the upcoming album. The song drew a mixed reaction from fans but became their biggest hit on Alternative radio in a decade (peaking at number 2 on the Alternative Airplay chart ). On August 16, Weezer announced Pacific Daydream, released on October 27. On August 17, the promotional single from the album, "Mexican Fender", was released. The following month, "Beach Boys" was released, and the month after, they released "Weekend Woman" to positive reception. "Happy Hour" was chosen as the second official single of the album, peaking at No. 9 on the Alternative Airplay chart.

The album received a Grammy nomination for Best Rock Album at the 61st Annual Grammy Awards.

The "Teal Album" and the "Black Album" (2018–2019)

Following a persistent Twitter campaign by a fan, Weezer released a cover of Toto's song "Africa" on May 29, 2018. Prior to this, the band released a cover of "Rosanna" to "troll" their fans. "Africa" reached number one on the Billboard Alternative Songs chart in August 2018, becoming the band's first number-one single since "Pork and Beans" in 2008. Two days later, on August 10, Toto responded by releasing a cover of Weezer's single "Hash Pipe". "Africa" eventually peaked at No. 51 on the Billboard Hot 100. The success of the "Africa" cover led Weezer to record an album of covers, the Teal Album, a surprise album released on January 24, 2019. The album was a commercial success as it peaked at No. 4 on the Billboard 200. In addition, all tracks charted on the Hot Rock and Alternative Songs chart.

On September 20, 2018, Weezer released "California Snow" as a single for the 2018 film Spell. It was chosen as the closing track for the "Black Album". On October 11, 2018, Weezer released "Can't Knock the Hustle", the lead single from their upcoming album. On November 21, they released the second single, "Zombie Bastards", and announced the "Black Album", produced by Dave Sitek and scheduled for March 1, 2019. An arena tour of the U.S. with the Pixies and supporting and international tour dates were also announced. On February 21, they released "High as a Kite" and "Living in LA" as the next singles. They would later play them on NPR Music to promote the album for their series of Tiny Desk Concerts.

During a Beats 1 interview by Zane Lowe on Apple Music on January 24, 2019, Cuomo announced that Weezer had already recorded the "basic tracks" to the follow-up album to the "Black Album". The album is being produced by Jake Sinclair, who produced the "White Album". Cuomo said the songwriting for the album is piano-based, and that some songs have string parts already recorded at Abbey Road Studios. For the recording process, Weezer departed from the modern "grid music" style (music recorded via modern software using grids to organize and manipulate the individual elements of recorded music) and did not perform to a "click" (i.e., metronome) for a more natural style. Cuomo said the album is tentatively titled "OK Human" and that the inspiration for the album is the 1970 album Nilsson Sings Newman. Furthermore, Cuomo said he is currently working on an album with the working title "Van Weezer" that harkens back to their heavier rock sound after noticing how crowds go nuts for big guitar solos at Weezer shows.

OK Human and Van Weezer (2019–2021)

On September 10, 2019, the band announced the Hella Mega Tour with Green Day and Fall Out Boy as headliners alongside themselves, with the Interrupters as an opening act. They also released the opening single, "The End of the Game," off their upcoming fifteenth studio album, Van Weezer. The song reached No. 2 on the Alternative Airplay chart. Cuomo said that the band would return "back to big guitars". He remarked that when the band would perform "Beverly Hills" live in concert, he would perform a guitar solo that was not present on the recorded version of the song. "We noticed that, recently, the crowd just goes crazy when I do that. So it feels like maybe the audience is ready for some shredding again."

The band recorded a version of "Lost in the Woods" for the 2019 film Frozen II, which was included on the soundtrack album. A music video was shot for the song, featuring the band and Frozen voice actor Kristen Bell.

On May 6, 2020, the band released the single and music video, "Hero", a tribute to essential workers during the COVID-19 pandemic. Simultaneously, they announced the delay of Van Weezer for a time to be determined. The song reached No. 1 on the Alternative Airplay chart. On May 10, Weezer guest-starred on an episode of The Simpsons, "The Hateful Eight-Year Olds", where a snippet of their song "Blue Dream" from Van Weezer was played. On August 14, 2020, the band announced that the album had been delayed to May 2021 in order to coincide with the rescheduled Hella Mega Tour. That same day, the third single, "Beginning of the End", was released as a part of the soundtrack for Bill & Ted Face the Music. 

On October 6, 2020, after Eddie Van Halen died, the album was dedicated to him. In addition to Van Halen, the album is also dedicated to Ric Ocasek, who produced the band's debut, The Blue Album, The Green Album, & Everything Will Be Alright in the End, as Ocasek passed away in September 2019.

On January 18, 2021, the band announced their fourteenth studio album, OK Human, following cryptic promotional floppy discs and links sent to some members of the Weezer Fan Club a few days prior. The announcement came with a release date of January 29. The single "All My Favorite Songs" was released on January 21. The song reached No.1 on the Alternative Airplay chart and was later nominated for Best Rock Song in the 64th Annual Grammy Awards. The album was planned to be released following Van Weezer, but when the album suffered a year-long delay following the COVID-19 pandemic, the band decided to shift their focus to completing OK Human first. Work on OK Human began as early as 2017, when the band decided to make an album that combined rock instrumentation with an orchestra.

The band hired a 38-piece-orchestra and recorded the album entirely with analog equipment to achieve their desired baroque sound. The album was additionally inspired by The Beach Boys' Pet Sounds and Harry Nilsson's Nilsson sings Newman (1970). The album title is a play on Radiohead's OK Computer.The track listing was announced on April 20, 2021, and the fourth single, "I Need Some of That" was released the following day. Van Weezer was released on May 7, 2021 along with an animated music video for "All The Good Ones". The album has been compared to their fourth studio album Maladroit (2002), and is inspired by 1970s and 1980s hard rock and heavy metal bands such as Kiss, Black Sabbath, Metallica and Van Halen (the last of whom inspired the album's title).

SZNZ (2021–present)
While doing an interview with NPR about the OK Human and Van Weezer albums, Cuomo hinted that the band were working on a four-album box-set called SZNZ (pronounced as "seasons"). Cuomo also described the potential musical styles of Spring and Fall, saying: "Spring can be a very breezy, carefree acoustic-type album, whereas Fall is going to be dance rock." He later stated that the albums, titled Spring, Summer, Fall, and Winter respectively, are planned for release in 2022 on the first astronomical day of each relevant season. Each season is linked to their own emotion. "Spring is optimism, Summer is anger, Autumn is anxiety, and Winter is sadness.

On March 11, 2022, Weezer officially announced the project, now titled SZNZ, would consist of four extended plays, with Fall renamed to Autumn. The first, SZNZ: Spring, was released on March 20, and the lead single "A Little Bit of Love" was released on March 16. The song reached No. 1 on the Alternative Airplay chart.

On June 20, 2022, Weezer appeared on Jimmy Kimmel Live!, debuting "Records", the lead single from SZNZ: Summer. The song reached No. 1 on the Alternative Airplay chart. The EP released at midnight on June 21, along with news of a Broadway Theater residency planned for September 2022. In August 2022, the residency was cancelled due to high expenses and poor ticket sales.

On September 19, 2022, the band performed once again under the name Goat Punishment at Troubadour (West Hollywood), where they played SZNZ: Winter for the first time. They also debuted the single "What Happens After You?" from SZNZ: Autumn, which was released on September 22, 2022. 
"What Happens After You?" was later performed on Jimmy Kimmel Live!. A music video for the single was released on November 29, 2022.

On December 9, 2022 Weezer released "I Want a Dog", the lead single from the last EP in the SZNZ series, SZNZ: Winter. SZNZ: Winter was released on December 21, 2022, alongside a music video for “Dark Enough To See The Stars”.

Musical style and influences
Weezer has been described as alternative rock, power pop, pop rock, pop punk, geek rock, emo, indie rock, emo pop, melodic metal, and pop. The members of Weezer have listed influence including Kiss (with direct references in the song "In the Garage"), Nirvana, the Pixies, the Cars (whose member Ric Ocasek produced several Weezer records), Cheap Trick, Pavement, Oasis, the Smashing Pumpkins, Green Day and Wax. Cuomo credited the Beach Boys as a major influence, specifically Pet Sounds; Bell described Weezer's sound as "Beach Boys with Marshall stacks". Operas and musicals such as Madama Butterfly (1904) and Jesus Christ Superstar (1970) influenced Pinkerton and Songs from the Black Hole. The band members' worship for hard rock and heavy metal music was the source of inspiration behind Van Weezer, including 1970s and 1980s bands like Kiss, Black Sabbath, Metallica, Slayer, Rush, and Van Halen (the last of whom inspired the album's title).

Artists such as Fun., Pete Wentz, Fall Out Boy, Panic! at the Disco, Blink-182, Steve Lacy,Charli XCX, Real Estate, Dinosaur Pile-Up, Cymbals Eat Guitars, DNCE, Ozma, Wavves, and the Fall of Troy cite Weezer as an influence.

Solo work and side projects
Patrick Wilson started his side-project the Special Goodness in 1996, for which he sings and plays guitar and bass. In May 2012, he released his fourth record with the Special Goodness, entitled Natural.

Brian Bell started the Space Twins in 1994 releasing an album, The End of Imagining, in 2003. In 2006, Bell started a new band called the Relationship, and did not contribute any songs for Weezer's Raditude in order to save material for the Relationship. The Relationship's self-titled debut was released in 2010, with a follow-up, Clara Obscura, released in 2017.

Former bassist Matt Sharp started the Rentals in 1994. After releasing Return of the Rentals in 1995, Sharp went on to quit Weezer in 1998 to focus more on the Rentals. Sharp has also released work under his own name. Mikey Welsh toured with Juliana Hatfield and played bass for the Kickovers. Scott Shriner played bass for Anthony Green's debut studio album Avalon.

On December 18, 2007, Cuomo released Alone - The Home Recordings of Rivers Cuomo, a compilation of his demos recorded from 1992 to 2007, including some demos from the unfinished Songs from the Black Hole album. A second compilation, Alone II: The Home Recordings of Rivers Cuomo, was released on November 25, 2008, and a third, Alone III: The Pinkerton Years, on December 12, 2011. The album was sold exclusively with a book, The Pinkerton Diaries, which collects Cuomo's writings from the Pinkerton era.

On March 20, 2013, Cuomo and Scott Murphy of the band Allister released Scott & Rivers, a Japanese-language album. They released their second album in April 2017. In November 2020, Cuomo released thousands of unreleased songs and demos from throughout Weezer's career on his personal website for purchase and download.

Musical contributions

In 1994, Weezer contributed the song "Jamie" to DGC Rarities, Vol. 1, which is a compilation of demos, B-sides, and covers recorded by bands on the label. It was the first appearance of the song until it was released as a B-side for the single of "Buddy Holly" and again on the Blue Album Deluxe Edition.

In 1999, Weezer contributed a cover of the song "Velouria" by The Pixies to the tribute album Where Is My Mind? A Tribute To The Pixies.

On July 22, 2003, Weezer contributed an acoustic cover of Green Day's "Worry Rock" to the compilation album A Different Shade of Green: A Tribute to Green Day.

On December 4, 2008, iOS developer Tapulous released the game Christmas with Weezer, featuring gameplay similar to Tap Tap Revenge and six Christmas carols performed by the band. A digital EP featuring the songs, titled Christmas with Weezer, was also released on December 16, 2008.

On March 9, 2010, Weezer appeared on an episode of the children's daytime television show Yo Gabba Gabba! and performed the song "All My Friends Are Insects". The song appeared on a compilation soundtrack album for the show, Yo Gabba Gabba! Music Is...Awesome! Volume 2, as well as a bonus track for the Weezer album Hurley.

On June 11, 2010, the band released a new single, "Represent", as an "unofficial" anthem for the US Men's soccer team to coincide with the 2010 FIFA World Cup. Although technically unofficial, the song was embraced by the team, and on June 23, 2010, US Soccer released a music video on their official YouTube channel featuring dramatic footage of the US team spliced with footage of Weezer performing.

In 2010, the band recorded a cover of "I'm a Believer" for the movie Shrek Forever After. Previously, Weezer had planned to include an early version of "My Best Friend" from Make Believe in Shrek 2, but it was rejected due to the song sounding "too much like it was written for Shrek".

In 2011, the band covered "You Might Think" by The Cars for the Pixar movie Cars 2. The song appears on the movie's official soundtrack.

In 2011, Weezer recorded a cover of "Rainbow Connection" with Hayley Williams for Muppets: The Green Album, a cover album of Muppets songs which also included OK Go, The Fray, Alkaline Trio, and others.

On September 20, 2018, Weezer released "California Snow" for the film Spell, which Cuomo also provided voicework for. The song later appeared on the Black Album.

In 2019, Weezer recorded a cover of "Lost In the Woods" for the Frozen II soundtrack.

In 2020–2021, Weezer released "It's Always Summer in Bikini Bottom" for The SpongeBob Movie: Sponge on the Runs film soundtrack.

In June 2021, Weezer contributed the song "Tell Me What You Want" to the video game Wave Break. The song is featured in a special level of the game called "Weezy Mode".

In August 2021, Weezer contributed a cover of Metallica's "Enter Sandman" to The Metallica Blacklist, a compilation of Metallica song covers by various artists, with each song getting several covers by different artists.

Band members

Current members
 Rivers Cuomo – lead vocals, guitar, keyboards 
 Patrick Wilson – drums, percussion ; backing vocals ; guitar, keyboards 
 Brian Bell – guitar, backing vocals ; keyboards 
 Scott Shriner – bass, backing vocals ; keyboards 

Current touring musicians
 Dave Elitch – drums, percussion 

Former members
 Jason Cropper – guitar, backing vocals 
 Matt Sharp – bass, backing vocals 
 Mikey Welsh – bass, backing vocals 

Former touring musicians
 Bobby Schneck – keyboards, guitar, bass 
 Josh Freese – drums, percussion 
 Daniel Brummel – keyboards, guitar 

Timeline

Awards and nominations

Grammy Awards

The Grammy Award is an award presented by The Recording Academy to recognize achievement in the mainly English-language music industry. Weezer has received one award from five nominations.

|-
| 2006 || "Beverly Hills" || Best Rock Song || 
|-
| 2009 || "Pork and Beans" || Best Music Video  || 
|-
| 2017 || Weezer || Best Rock Album || 
|-
|2019 || Pacific Daydream || Best Rock Album || 
|-
|2022 || "All My Favorite Songs" || Best Rock Song || 
|}

iHeartRadio Music Awards

The iHeartRadio Music Award was founded by iHeartRadio in 2014. From 2014 to 2018 the event was broadcast live on NBC, and in 2019 the event was broadcast on FOX. 

|-
| rowspan=2|2019
| rowspan=2|"Africa"
| Alternative Rock Song of the Year
| 
|-
| Best Cover Song 
| 

Kerrang! Awards

|-
| 2008
| "Pork and Beans"
| Best Video
| 

MTV Europe Music Awards

The MTV Europe Music Award is an award presented by Viacom International Media Networks Europe to honour artists and music in popular culture.

|-
| rowspan="2" | 1995 || Weezer || Best New Act || 
|-
| "Buddy Holly" || Best Video  || 
|-
| 2008 || "Pork and Beans" || Best Video  || 
|}

MTV Video Music Awards

The MTV Video Music Award is an award presented by the cable channel MTV to honor the best in the music video medium. Weezer has received five award from eight nominations.

|-
| rowspan="5" | 1995 || rowspan="5" | "Buddy Holly" || Video of the Year || 
|-
| Best Alternative Video || 
|-
| Breakthrough Video || 
|-
| Best Direction  || 
|-
| Best Editing  || 
|-
| 2001 || "Hash Pipe" || Best Rock Video || 
|-
| 2005 || "Beverly Hills" || Best Rock Video|| 
|-
| 2008 || "Pork and Beans" || Best Editing  || 
|}

Teen Choice Awards

The Teen Choice Awards were established in 1999 to honor the year's biggest achievements in music, movies, sports and television, being voted by young people aged between 13 and 19. 

|-
| 2005
| "Beverly Hills"
| Choice Music: Rock Song
|

Discography

Weezer (Blue Album) (1994)Pinkerton (1996)
Weezer (Green Album) (2001)Maladroit (2002)Make Believe (2005)
Weezer (Red Album) (2008)Raditude (2009)Hurley (2010)Everything Will Be Alright in the End (2014)
Weezer (White Album) (2016)Pacific Daydream (2017)
Weezer (Teal Album) (2019)
Weezer (Black Album) (2019)OK Human (2021)Van Weezer'' (2021)

ReferencesBibliography'

External links

Weezerpedia

 
1992 establishments in California
Alternative rock groups from California
American power pop groups
Emo musical groups from California
DGC Records artists
Grammy Award winners
Indie rock musical groups from California
Musical groups established in 1992
Musical groups disestablished in 1998
Musical groups reestablished in 2000
Musical groups from Los Angeles
Musical quartets
Geek rock groups
Pop punk groups from California